Eddy Wata (born 3 March 1976) is a Nigerian Eurodance artist. He is most popular with his dance tunes "I Love My People", "My Dream" and "Jam".

Biography
Eddy Wata was born in Benin City Edo State Nigeria and began to play with a battery-operated keyboard at a very young age. He listened to Jamaican artists which contributed to his love of reggae.

in Nigeria, he formed a band, and following many television appearances, he toured Europe in 2001. In the Netherlands, he was acquainted with the manager Lino Longoni and in 2003, after being placed under contract by the Italian producer Diego Milesi became popular star in European dance scene.

His singles included the 2003 hit "Jam", followed by "In Your Mind" and "The Bomb". But it was with his 2008 international hit "I Love My People" that he reached the top of dance charts in many countries. He followed it up with "The Light" and in 2009 "My Dream" and "I Like the Way" in 2010 and "Senorita" in 2011.

He remains greatly popular in Nigeria and many African countries, in Italy, France, Spain, Belgium, Netherlands, in Scandinavian and Eastern European countries, in Brazil, the Middle East up to the Far East.

Singles
Charting singles

Other songs
2004: "Asperger"
2006: "What a Boy"
2008: "The Light"
2009: "My Dream"
2010: "I Like the Way"
2010: "I Wanna Dance"
2011: "Señorita"
2012: "Superstar"
2013: "I Feel So Good"
2013: "My Season"
2014: "I Wa le Wa"
2015: "Shake Your Bom Bom"
featured in
2004: "A Silvia" (Gabry Ponte feat. Eddy Wata) in Gabry Ponte album Dr. Jekyll and Mr. DJ
2004: "Bring Me to Life" (Mixtery feat. Eddy Wata) (sampling on Evanescence song)

References

21st-century Nigerian male singers
Nigerian dance musicians
1976 births
Living people
Nigerian people of Jamaican descent